Aviyal is a 2016 Indian Tamil-language independent anthology film consisting of four short films directed by Alphonse Putharen, Shameer Sultan, Mohit Mehra, Lokesh Kanagaraj and Guru Smaran. Nivin Pauly, Bobby Simha, Amrutha Srinivasan, Rajeev Govinda Pillai, Arjunan, Ramachandran Durairaj, and Deepak Paramesh have featured in the short films included in the anthology.

Produced by Karthik Subbaraj under his Stone Bench Creations and Bench Flix, it was their second venture after Bench Talkies, which was initially launched after the phenomenal response of the latter. The project Aviyal was launched earlier in November 2015, and the film was distributed by Thenandal Films, which had a theatrical release on 11 March 2016.

Plot synopsis
Aviyal is a collection of five short films; A young man attracted to her aunt, a filmmaker chasing robbers who have stolen his short film, two friends going on a trip to deposit the ashes of their friend, and a gangster narrating a story.

Cast

Production 
Following the encouraging response to Bench Talkies – The First Bench (2015), Karthik Subbaraj announced plans of releasing a second anthology of short films soon after the initial project had released. The anthologies will be released under his Bench Flix, an initiative driven by Subbaraj's production house Stone Bench Creations, to provide reach and recognition to independent short film makers by distributing their short films across different avenues such as theaters, television, in-flight entertainment, radio and digital platforms.

In November 2015, a second production titled Aviyal was revealed to be in the editing stages, though the release of the film was delayed as a result of the 2015 South Indian floods. Subsequently, in January 2016, it was revealed that the anthology of films would include Alphonse Putharen's Eli starring Nivin Pauly, while other actors including Bobby Simha, Arjunan Nandakumar and Amrutha Srinivasan would appear in the film.

Soundtrack 

The film's soundtrack album features six tracks (of four songs and two instrumentals) composed by Rajesh Murugesan, Javed Riaz, Shammeer Sultan, Vishal Chandrasekhar, Anthony Daasan and Raghu Dixit, with lyrics written by Shameer Sultan, Suryaa Balakumaran, Mani Amudhavan and Charukesh Sekar. Excluding Daasan and Dixit, four of them also contributed to the film's background score.

Marketing and release 
Aviyal was premiered at the 13th Chennai International Film Festival on 10 January 2016. After receiving positive response from the audience, the makers unveiled the first look and the first teaser on 22 January 2016, by Vijay Sethupathi and Bobby Simha who worked with Karthik Subbaraj in Iraivi (2016) in late January, while a theatrical trailer was unveiled in early February. The film opened up in more than 70 screens in Tamil Nadu, 30 screens in Kerala, and in a few screens in the US on 11 March 2016.

Reception 
Baradwaj Rangan, writing for The Hindu, stated "Aviyal, the second anthology, is a huge improvement—not just in terms of craft and performances, but also because the filmmakers don’t expect us to watch with caveats." M. Suganth of The Times of India gave 3.5 out of 5 stars and stated "The shorts in Aviyal are streets ahead of those that formed the first edition, Bench Talkies. They are daring, wacky and fresh. A couple of these films even manage to transcend the made-for-TV visual style of shorts." Behindwoods gave 2.75 out of 5 and stated "Aviyal does a smooth job of entertaining the viewers and most certainly does not disappoint. Though after the movie one might feel the pang of the absence of a usual movie pattern, the satisfaction of having watched something new and offbeat will make up for it." S. Saraswathi of Rediff gave 2.5 out of 5 stars stating "Karthik Subbaraj’s Aviyal may not be an exotic dish, but does have all the ingredients of a fun and wholesome meal."

References

External links 
 

2016 films
Indian independent films
2010s Tamil-language films
Films scored by Raghu Dixit
Films scored by Vishal Chandrasekhar
Films scored by Anthony Daasan
Films scored by Rajesh Murugesan
Indian anthology films
2016 independent films